Westallgäu is the western part of the Allgäu in Germany. It contains large parts of the districts of Lindau in the south west of the region, Swabia in Bavaria and the district of Ravensburg in the south east of Baden-Württemberg. Westallgäu extends to the north to, amongst others, the towns of Leutkirch, Wangen and Isny. Westallgäu is bordered by Oberallgäu to the east and the Austrian state (Land) of Vorarlberg to the south. To the southwest, Westallgäu borders Lake Constance through the town of Lindau. The Adelegg mountains located in Westallgäu represent foothills of the Alps, reaching an altitude of 1,118 m at the Schwarzer Grat ("Black Ridge").

Towns and municipalities 
 Gestratz
 Grünenbach
 Heimenkirch
 Hergatz
 Hergensweiler
 Lindenberg
 Maierhöfen
 Oberreute
 Opfenbach
 Röthenbach
 Scheidegg-Scheffau
 Sigmarszell
 Stiefenhofen
 Weiler-Simmerberg
 Amtzell
 Argenbühl
 Arnach
 Bad Wurzach
 Bodnegg
 Friesenhofen
 Isny
 Karsee
 Kisslegg
 Leutkirch
 Schlier
 Urlau
 Waldburg
 Wangen
 Wolfegg

External links
Orchids in Allgäu

Regions of Baden-Württemberg
Upper Swabia